Arslanbey or Aslanbey is a village in the District of Kartepe, Kocaeli Province, Turkey. Before the Armenian genocide it was populated by Armenians and was known as Aslanbeg. The Armenian dialect of Aslanbeg had some unusual features; it was described by Hrachia Adjarian but now is extinct.

References

Villages in Kartepe District